Nina Alexeyevna Lobkovskaya (born 8 March 1925) served as a sniper for the Red Army and attained the rank of Lieutenant in a separate sniper unit of the 3rd Shock Army during World War II. In the war she reached 89 confirmed kills, making her one of the deadliest women snipers of the war.

Early life 
She was born the eldest of five children. Her family moved to Stalinabad in the Tajik Soviet Socialist Republic following the ill health of her father Alexei who had enlisted in the Red Army in 1942 before being killed in the battle for Voronezh in October of the same year. While the Second World War was not fought in Tajikistan itself, after the arrival of numerous refugees from the war to the Tajik SSR Lobkovskaya took the impact of the war to heart and volunteered for the military after graduating from school under the advice of the Komsomol.

Training and service
Lobkovskaya was sent to Veshnyaki in Eastern Russia to train as snipers at the Central Women’s Sniper Training School. From February 1945 until the end of the war, Lobkovskaya commanded a company of female snipers who eventually saw action in the Battle of Berlin. On one night while defending a section of road, the unit assisted in the capture of 27 enemy combatants. During the war, she reached 89 confirmed kills of enemy combatants, having fought on the Baltic and Belarusian Fronts.

Civilian life 
Having been demobilized in 1945, she went on to graduate from the history faculty at Moscow State University and work as a lecturer at the Central Museum of V. I. Lenin.

Awards and honors 
 Order of the Red Banner
 Two Orders of the Patriotic War 1st class
 Order of the Patriotic War 2nd class
 Order of Glory 2nd and 3rd class
 Medal "For Courage"
 Medal "For Battle Merit"
 campaign and jubilee medals

References

Further reading 

 
 
 

1925 births
Living people
Soviet military snipers
Soviet military personnel of World War II
Women in the Russian and Soviet military
Soviet women in World War II
Recipients of the Order of Glory